William J. Sweeney was a member of the Wisconsin State Assembly.

Biography
Sweeney was born in Glenmore, Wisconsin. He later resided in De Pere, Wisconsin.

Career
Sweeney was a member of the Assembly from 1933 to 1946 and was a Democrat. Previously, he had served as Town Clerk of Glenmore from 1922 to 1927 and Town Chairman of Glenmore from 1927 to 1929.

References

People from De Pere, Wisconsin
Democratic Party members of the Wisconsin State Assembly
Mayors of places in Wisconsin
City and town clerks
Year of birth missing
Year of death missing